Portrait of Countess Karoly is an oil on canvas painting by French realist painter Gustave Courbet, created in 1865.

It was sold by $ 717,500 on 5 May 1998 at Christie's.

References

1865 paintings
Paintings by Gustave Courbet
Portraits of women